Diphenylphosphine, also known as diphenylphosphane, is an organophosphorus compound with the formula (C6H5)2PH. This foul-smelling, colorless liquid is easily oxidized in air. It is a precursor to organophosphorus ligands for use as catalysts.

Synthesis
Diphenylphosphine can be prepared from triphenylphosphine by reduction to lithium diphenylphosphide, which can be protonated to give the title compound:
PPh3 + 2 Li → LiPPh2 + LiPh
LiPPh2 + H2O → Ph2PH + LiOH

Uses and reactions
In the laboratory, diphenylphosphine is a common intermediate.  It can be deprotonated to give diphenylphosphide derivatives:
Ph2PH + nBuLi → Ph2PLi + nBuH
The preparation of phosphine ligands, Wittig-Horner reagents, and phosphonium salts are commonly accomplished by alkylating diphenylphosphine. The hydrogen atom connected to phosphorus undergoes Michael-like addition to activated alkenes, providing products with which to produce phosphine ligands such as 1,2-bis(diphenylphosphino)ethane (Ph2PC2H4PPh2). Diphenylphosphine and especially diphenylphosphide derivatives are nucleophiles, so they add to carbon – heteroatom double bonds.  For example, in the presence of concentrated hydrochloric acid at 100 °C, diphenylphosphine adds to the carbon atom in benzaldehyde to give (phenyl-(phenylmethyl)phosphoryl)benzene.
Ph2PH + PhCHO → Ph2P(O)CH2Ph

Compared to tertiary phosphines, diphenylphosphine is weakly basic.  The pKa of the protonated derivative is 0.03:
Ph2PH2+       Ph2PH  +  H+

Handling properties
Diphenylphosphine readily oxidizes. 
Ph2PH + O2 → Ph2P(O)OH 
An intermediate in this oxidation is diphenylphosphine oxide. The use of the diphenylphosphine–borane complex, Ph2PH•BH3 avoids the problem of phosphine oxidation by protecting the phosphine from oxidation and is available through chemical vendors.

References

Phenyl compounds
Phosphines
Foul-smelling chemicals